The University Institutes of Technology or IUT are parts of the university system in France. The IUT were created in 1966. There are 108 IUTs which are attached to 80 universities including the ones in the French Overseas Territories and Departments.

The IUTs allow the preparation of a three-year undergraduate technical diploma called a Bachelor universitaire de technologie. Until 2020, the IUTs allowed the preparation of a two-year undergraduate technical diploma called a Diplôme universitaire de technologie or DUT.

After finishing their DUT, students have the option to work, do a one-year professional degree called "Licence Professionnelle" (a course also offered by IUTs), or further their studies in a university.

List of IUTs

References 

http://www.enseignementsup-recherche.gouv.fr/cid21016/liste-des-instituts-universitaires-de-technologie-i.u.t.html

External links 
 Dedicated site
 List of IUT by rectorate
 Other site about IUT

Education in France